Rocking Chair may refer to:
 Rocking chair, a piece of furniture
 "Rockin' Chair" (1929 song), a 1929 popular song with music composed by Hoagy Carmichael
 "Rockin' Chair" (Gwen McCrae song), 1975
 Rockin' Chair (Roy Eldridge album), 1955
 Rockin' Chair (Jonathan Edwards album), 1976
 Rockin' Chairs, a doo-wop band active in the 1950s
 "Rocking Chair", a song by Labi Siffre from the 1971 album The Singer and the Song